Anti chu: 350,000
Chu: 150,000
Anti chu 2000 people died
Chu
The Battle of Chuisha took place in 301 BC in modern-day Henan between a 4-state alliance of Qi, Wei, Han and Qin against Chu. The Chu forces were defeated and their commanding general was killed.

References

301 BC
4th century BC in China
Chuisha